Madidi is a national park in the upper Amazon river basin in Bolivia. Established in 1995, it has an area of 18,958km². Along with the nearby protected (though not necessarily contiguous) areas Manuripi-Heath, Apolobamba, and the Manu Biosphere Reserve (Peru), Madidi is part of one of the largest protected areas in the world.

Ranging from the Andes Mountains to the rainforests of the Tuichi River, Madidi and its neighbors are recognized as one of the planet's most biologically diverse regions. In particular, Madidi protects parts of the Bolivian Yungas and Bolivian montane dry forests ecoregions.

Madidi National Park can be accessed from San Buenaventura, reached by crossing the Beni River by passenger ferry from Rurrenabaque.

The local people who have migrated here from the Andean highlands speak the Quechua language. The park is home to indigenous groups including the Tacanan-speaking Tacana and Ese Ejja, the closely related Tsimané and Mosetén, and the voluntarily isolated Toromona.

Some ecolodges are found in and around the Madidi National Park. The oldest and best known is Chalalan Ecolodge in Chalalán on the Tuichi River, a community-based enterprise that generates economic benefits to indigenous communities.

Location
The National Park and Integrated Management Natural Area Madidi is located in the northwest region of the Department of La Paz, in the provinces Franz Tamayo, Iturralde and Abel Bautista Saavedra. The municipalities involved are Apolo, San Buenaventura, Ixiamas, Curva, and Pelechuco.

The park is bordered to the west by the adjacent Tambopata-Candamo Reserve and Bahuaja-Sonene National Park in Peru, to the east by the TCO (Tierra Comunitaria de Origen, 'indigenous community land') Tacana I, to the north by TCO Tacana II, and to the south by the Apolobamba Integrated Management Natural Area, TCO Lecos Apolo, TCO Lecos Larecaja and the Pilón Lajas Biosphere Reserve and Communal Lands.

The PN and IMNA Madidi is one of the largest protected areas in Bolivia, with a total land area according to the Supreme Decree constituting 18957.5 square kilometers, of which 12,715km² come under the heading of National Park and 6,242.5km² are categorized under the Integrated Management Natural Area.

The park boundaries are between 12° 30' and 14° 44' southern latitude and between 67° 30' and 69° 51' western longitude.

The area under conservation covers an altitudinal gradient ranging from 180 to 5,760 meters above sea level and covers a variety of ecosystems.

Weather
The climate is cold in the alpine region, temperate in areas of intermediate elevation, and tropical in the northern lowlands.

The winds come predominantly from the north, and cold fronts from the south have little impact on the temperature of the Madidi region. The dry season coincides with the austral winter. The average annual temperature is 26 °C but varies greatly, depending on the altitude. Isotemas

According to data from Assane (2002), in the region of Apollo the annual rainfall is 716mm; the rainy season is from October to March, and the dry season is from May to September.Isoyetas

Flora 
Madidi National Park hosts more than 8,000 documented species of vascular plants, with the likelihood of many more being discovered.

The Madidi Project of the Missouri Botanical Garden had identified at least 132 new plant species in Madidi as of 2010.

Wildlife
Dr. Robert Wallace, wildlife biologist, is credited for discovering in Madidi a previously unidentified titi monkey, a new species to science. This monkey is endemic to the area. The right to name the new species was auctioned through an agreement between the scientists, the Bolivian National Protected Area Service (SERNAP), and the Foundation for the Development of the Protected Areas (FUNDESNAP). The auction was won by online casino GoldenPalace.com, which paid US$650,000 for a trust fund that now generates enough income to pay for fourteen park guards annually. The species was named Plecturocebus aureipalatii with the specific epithet meaning "of the Golden Palace".  The park is also notable for its over 1,254 bird species, representing 14% of the world’s 9,000 bird species.

In addition to the biodiversity found on its land, there is also a rich and varied life found here in the water with many fish species.

(undescribed species not included)
 Mammals: 272 species
 Birds: 1,254 species
 Fish: 496 species
 Amphibians: 213 species
 Reptiles: 204 species
 Insects: Madidi has over 120,000 different species of insects.

Ecotourism

National Park and Natural Integrated Management Area Madidi is home to several ventures of Responsible Tourism and Community Ecotourism, one of the most recognized locally and internationally is Chalalan Ecolodge, owned by the indigenous people of San José de Uchupiamonas. Followed by San Miguel del Bala Ecolodge owned San Miguel Tacana community, both located in the Madidi National Park. Recently there were opened other local initiatives as Berraco del Madidi Amazon adventure tour, Madidi Jungle Ecolodge, Sadiri Ecolodge and Ecolodge Madidi heart.

Chalalan Ecolodge is a community ecotourism venture that belongs to the indigenous village of San José de Uchupiamonas, which receives the profits from running the hostel, besides contributing in other areas such as health and education. Chalalan operates since 1999 offering tours to the Madidi National Park. The tourism product includes transportation from Rurrenabaque to the hostel on a tour of the Beni and Tuichi rivers, cabin accommodation Tacana style rooms with private bathrooms, international fusion cuisine - English Amazon and guidance for indigenous community who speak Quechua, Spanish and they are trained and certified. Chalalan has a system of solar panels that feed the hostel with clean energy and has a system of solid waste management and wastewater treatment to reduce its environmental impact. The hostel has 9 cabins located in the vicinity of Lake Chalalan, which has taken the name for the hostel. Chalalan has 30 km of environmental interpretation trails, paddle canoes to get around the lagoon, a large gazebo and a dining room that also has a social area. The average stay is 4 days and 3 nights.

Sadiri Lodge 
Sadiri Lodge was born as an alternative proposal for protection against extractive and deforestation activities that threaten the existence of this rich, diverse natural area and water reservoir, through responsible and non-profit community tourism that also promotes the local development of the communities. Currently, Sadiri Lodge is managed and administered by community members of the San José De Uchupiamonas Indigenous People, a community that is located in the heart of the most mega-diverse protected area in the world, Madidi. The main goal of Sadiri Lodge is to preserve the 34 thousand hectares of pristine forest, natural water reservoirs, and creatures of the living Bolivian jungle.

The mission of Sadiri Lodge is to protect the forest whose exuberant natural wealth creates a refuge for the species that inhabit the place. Within the area that Sadiri guards, there are more than 430 species of birds, this being an indicator of the natural importance of the area, which translates into the diversity of reptiles, insects, amphibians and magnificent species of flora that adorn the environment such as bromeliads and orchids. In addition, being a forest at 900 meters above sea level, it has a pleasant climate, housing different species of monkeys, whose morning chorus awakens the forest, and the little ones delight with their shrieks and jumps from tree to tree. But the melodic sounds are offered by the birds, making the jungle a naturally symphonic theatre. Not to mention the spectacle of the hummingbirds that flutter in the environment, and the most colorful insects and butterflies, among others. All of them are skilfully identified by the expert local Uchupiamonas guides, who use their ancestral knowledge of the forest, with animal calling techniques, their eyes and ears, complemented with stories of their culture, making an unforgettable and life-learning experience for those who visit Sadiri Lodge.

Berraco Madidi Amazon adventure tour is a private initiative of a member of the indigenous community Quechua-Tacana José de Uchupiamonas, located in the Madidi National Park and Natural Area of Integrated Management. The idea arose in 2007 and became a reality in 2010, with great enthusiasm and a lot of experience gained over many years as a guide. It is operated 100% by the population of the community in order to generate jobs and benefits to it. The camps (Ecocamp) is surrounded in the same territory as the community (210 thousand hectares), the Ecocamp is 6 hours away by boat outboard motor, it is the deepest in the Madidi National Park and has cabins built traditionally Quechua-Takana style using the same natural resources.

Madidi Jungle Ecolodge, which has been open to visitors in mid-2011, is a 100% local initiative, operated by indigenous families of the TCO San José de Uchupiamonas, which comprises 210 hectares of forest within the Madidi National Park, region Amazon of Bolivia. The Ecolodge is located 3.5 hours away by motor boat sailing upstream the Beni and Tuichi rivers in the Madidi National Park and has a capacity to accommodate 14 visitors in traditional Amazonian style cabins.

The enterprises of Responsible Tourism and Ecotourism settled within the Madidi National Park, comfortable boats offer transportation, unique accommodation, the best local guides and interpreters exquisite and delicious homemade food prepared on the basis of local products. Rurrenabaque is beginning to live this unforgettable adventure ecotourism by visiting the Bolivian Amazon.

The Bala Dam Project
One of the threats against the Madidi NP has been (and perhaps still is) the proposed Bala Dam Project at the Beni River in the Bala Gorge, where the Beni River breaks through the Bala Mountain Range.

The proposed hydroelectric dam project has a long history, and the project (and its threats against the nature in the area) was especially relevant in the year 1998. After some years the project apparently was given up, but the idea has come up again in 2007.

The dam would cause the flooding of a huge area, about 2000 square kilometres, including a great part of the Madidi NP, and the catastrophic consequences are evident.

Potential dam failures and dam break would have catastrophic consequences. Numerical simulation suggests that the whole area would be flooded for several days.

The Apolo-Ixiamas road project

Another of the main threats against Madidi is the proposed construction of the Apolo-Ixiamas road. This is an old demand from some local politicians and communities from the Altiplano, who want to colonize the park for timber and agriculture exploitation. However, independent studies from the NGO Conservation Strategy Fund have shown that this project is not a good development alternative for the region (Fleck et al., 2006a, 2006b). The project is economically unfeasible and would induce significant deforestation within the protected area (Fleck et al., 2006b).

Environmental losses caused by the road project could threaten current and future conservation and tourism activities in this protected area, which generate significant economic benefits to the region (Fleck et al., 2006a; Malki et al., 2007). Alternative investments such as improving the road that connects Apolo to La Paz (Peñarrieta & Fleck, 2007) and directing the road investment towards social investments such as health and education (Fleck et al., 2006b) have greater prospects of improving local quality of life while maintaining the important environmental services provided by Madidi.

See also 
 Madidi River
 Chalalan
 The National Geographic Magazine, March 2000; Vol. 197, No.3, page 2-23
 Serere Eco Reserve Traveller Reviews on Trip on Trip Advisor in Rurrenabaque Madidi Mosaic, Bolivia

References
Fleck, L. C., Amend, M., Painter, L., Reid, J. (2006a). Regional economic benefits from conservation: the case of Madidi.  Serie Técnica No. 5. Conservation Strategy Fund, Bolivia. 82 p..

Fleck, L. C., Painter, L., Reid, J., Amend, M. (2006b). A road through Madidi: an environmental-economic analysis. Serie Técnica No. 6. Conservation Strategy Fund, Bolivia. 100 p..

Malky, A., Pastor, C,Limaco, A., Mamani, G., Limaco, Z., Fleck, L. C. (2007). El efecto Chalalán: Un ejercicio de valoración económica para una empresa comunitaria. Serie Técnica No. 13. Conservation Strategy Fund, Bolivia. 74 p..

Peñarrieta, L., Fleck, L. C. (2007). Beneficios y costos del mejoramiento de la carretera Charazani - Apolo. Serie Técnica No. 14. Conservation Strategy Fund, Bolivia. 76 p..

External links
 Servicio Nacional de Áreas Protegidas, SERNAP: The Madidi National Park - El Parque Nacional Madidi: Official website
 Regional economic benefits from conservation: the case of Madidi
 A road through Madidi: an environmental-economic analysis
 El efecto Chalalán: Un ejercicio de valoración económica para una empresa comunitaria
 Beneficios y costos del mejoramiento de la carretera Charazani - Apolo
 Madidi.de, in three languages, "Projekt Regenzeit e.V." (Cf. *Urwaldprojekte.de)
 How Does WCS Protect Madidi? (Wildlife Conservation Society).
 Madidi National Park and IMNA - Park Profile, ParksWatch.org
 Madidi photos, Photo gallery of landscape, flora and fauna of Madidi National Park
 Bolivian Conservationist Calls for Preservation of Madidi Region, One of the Most Biodiverse Areas of World video by Democracy Now!

See also 
 Panthera onca boliviensis

National parks of Bolivia
Tourist attractions in La Paz Department (Bolivia)
Geography of La Paz Department (Bolivia)
Protected areas established in 1995